Gill Township is a township in Clay County, Kansas, United States.  As of the 2000 census, its population was 140.

Geography
According to the USGS, it contains one cemetery, Saint Johns.

References
 USGS Geographic Names Information System (GNIS)

External links
 City-Data.com

Townships in Clay County, Kansas
Townships in Kansas